The 20th Forqué Awards were presented on 12 January 2015 at the Palacio Municipal de Congresos in Madrid. The gala, broadcast on La 1, was hosted by Ana Morgade.

History 
An Argentine-Spanish co-production, Damián Szifrón's Wild Tales was nominated both for Best (Spanish) Film and for Best Latin-American Film.

On behalf of Enrique Cerezo, Concha Velasco handed Spanish public broadcaster RTVE the EGEDA Gold Medal in recognition to its contribution to the Spanish film industry.

Hosted by Ana Morgade, the gala featured performances by Café Quijano, Juan Zelada, AlamedaDosoulna, India Martínez, and theatre group .

Winners and nominees
The winners and nominees are listed as follows:

References

External links 
 Gala of the 20th Forqué Awards on RTVE Play

Forqué Awards
2015 film awards
2015 in Madrid